Helgi Abrahamsen (born 24 November 1966) is a Faroese journalist and politician of the conservative-liberal Union Party. He was a member of Løgting from 2008-2015. He lost his seat in the 2015 election but was re-elected in 2019. He was the Minister of Environment, Industry and Trade from 2019 until he stepped down and was replaced by Magnus Rasmussen in 2021.

References

1966 births
Living people
Members of the Løgting
Ministers of Trade and Industry of the Faroe Islands
Union Party (Faroe Islands) politicians
People from Fuglafjørður
Government ministers of the Faroe Islands
21st-century politicians